Timeline of Classical antiquity
see:
Timeline of ancient Greece
Timeline of Roman history

See also
Timeline of Christianity
Timeline of post-classical history
History of Mesopotamia
Timeline of Middle Eastern history
Timeline of ancient history

Classical antiquity
Classical antiquity